Folk of the 80's (Part III) is the second studio album by Canadian synthpop group Men Without Hats, released in early 1984. The album reached #127 on the U.S. Billboard 200 albums chart. It was the band's final album with the lineup consisting of Ivan Doroschuk (vocals), Stefan Doroschuk (guitar), Colin Doroschuk (keyboards) and Allan McCarthy (keyboards).

During the recording process, "The Safety Dance" became big in America, requiring the band to put recording on hold and do a tour.

This album was re-released on CD in Canada in 1997 by Oglio Records as part of a "two-fer" including Rhythm of Youth.

It was also re-mastered and re-released in Canada in 2010 by Bulldog Brothers/Unidisc. In addition to the tracks on the LP, it also contains an extended version of "Where Do The Boys Go?". The extended version of "Where Do the Boys Go?" was intended to be used on the original CD release by Statik in 1984, but was left off.

Track listing
For all songs: lyrics by Ivan Doroschuk, music by Ivan Doroschuk, Colin Doroschuk, Stefan Doroschuk and Allan McCarthy

"No Dancing" – 2:09
"Unsatisfaction" – 3:15
"Where Do the Boys Go?" – 3:55
"Mother's Opinion" – 8:48 (7:48 without false fade)
"Eurotheme" – 2:40
"Messiahs Die Young" – 4:20
"I Know Their Name" – 3:55
"Folk of the 80's" – 4:17
"I Sing Last/Not for Tears" – 3:15

2010 remaster bonus track

"Where Do the Boys Go?" (extended mix) – 6:20

On the original 1984 release and the 1997 twofer, "Mother's Opinion" faded out, then faded back in with a flange effect, a reference to Roxy Music (one of Ivan Doroschuk's favorite bands) having done something similar with the track "In Every Dream Home a Heartache" from their 1973 album For Your Pleasure. This section was removed from the 2010 remaster and did not appear on some international releases of the original LP release.

Personnel
 Ivan Doroschuk – voice, electronics, guitars, percussion, piano
 Allan McCarthy – electronics, percussion, harmonica, backing vocals
 Stefan Doroschuk – guitars, electronics, backing vocals
 Colin Doroschuk – electronics, voices

with:

Dixon Van Winkle – snare drum on "No Dancing"
Anne Dussault – backing vocals on "Where Do the Boys Go?"

1984 albums
Men Without Hats albums
MCA Records albums